Chionanthus pluriflorus is a tree in the family Oleaceae. The specific epithet pluriflorus means "many-flowered".

Description
Its bark is greenish. The flowers are yellow or yellowish green.

Distribution and habitat
Chionanthus pluriflorus is endemic to Borneo. Its habitat is mixed dipterocarp forest, often by rivers or in swamps, to  altitude.

References

pluriflorus
Endemic flora of Borneo
Trees of Borneo
Plants described in 1895